Ken Martin (born 1952) is a South Australian sculptor.

History
Ken began sculpting professionally in wood, in 1975.

He undertook a study tour of Great Britain and Italy in 1992, to coincide with a showing of his work in the Royal Academy of Arts' "Summer Exhibition" in London, which coincided with a commitment to bronze as his favoured medium. Since then the majority of his work has been commissioned representational studies.

Notable works
The Net Mender, featuring Jack Davies, in Port Lincoln
Len Beadell Surveyor and author (2004)
Makybe Diva, triple Melbourne Cup winner, in Port Lincoln (2006)
Dr. Robin Warren AC, Nobel Laureate pathologist, for St Peter's College, Adelaide (2009)
Jason Gillespie at Adelaide Oval (2010)
Vaiben Louis Solomon Lord Mayor and Parliamentarian (2012)
Esther Lipman MBE, Adelaide's first woman councillor, in Adelaide's North Parklands
Barrie Robran MBE, triple Magarey Medallist near the south gate at Adelaide Oval (2013)

References

External links
Ken Martin, sculptor

21st-century Australian sculptors
1952 births
Living people